Naukar Biwi Ka is a 1983 Hindi comedy film, a remake of the Punjabi film Naukar Wohti Da (1974). The film stars Dharmendra, Raj Babbar, Anita Raj, Reena Roy, Kader Khan, Pran and Om Prakash. It was directed by Rajkumar Kohli.

Plot

Inspector Amar Nath apprehends and arrests a notorious gangster who goes by different aliases (Deshbandhu Jagannath, Pinto, Abdul Karim), and gets him sentenced to prison for several years. Amar, who comes from a wealthy family, defies his father, Jagirdar Bishamber Nath, and marries a poor woman, Sheela Sharma (Neeta Mehta). He is asked to leave the family home. Amar and Sheela settle elsewhere and soon become parents to a daughter, Jyoti. They meet with the parents of young Deepak Kumar and arrange a child-marriage of their daughter with Deepak. Pinto escapes from prison, hunts down Amar and Sheela, and kills them. Luckily, a loyal employee and chauffeur, Abdul, saves their daughter's life. He takes her to her grandfather, who accepts her, feeling remorse for his earlier behavior towards his only son. Years later, Deepak and Jyoti have grown up. While Jyoti still lives with her wealthy grandpa, Deepak's dad has died, leaving Deepak and his mother destitute. When Deepak's mother tries to finalize Jyoti's marriage to her son, Jyoti humiliates her. This enrages Deepak. He goes to confront Jyoti and ends up fighting with Jyoti's boyfriend, Raman. In return, Jyoti slaps Deepak. Deepak vows to make her apologize to his mother for her behavior and change her attitude towards him and their marriage. In a twist of fate, Jyoti has to seek Deepak's help in pacifying her grandfather so that he agrees to her marriage with Raman.

In another part of the story, film star Sandhya meets Deepak and grows fond of him. Jyoti eventually grows jealous of Deepak's friendship with Sandhya and admits that she has feelings for Deepak.

Cast

Dharmendra as Deepak Kumar 'Deepu'
Anita Raj as Jyoti Nath / Rani
Raj Babbar as Prabhat Kumar
Reena Roy as Sandhya
Kader Khan as Deshbandhu Jagannath / Pinto / Abdul Karim
Rajeev Anand as Raman Jagannath, Son of Deshbandhu
Pran as Abdul
Om Prakash as Jagirdar Bishambharnath
Vinod Mehra as Inspector Amarnath
Neeta Mehta as Sheela Sharma
A. K. Hangal as Mr. Sharma (Sheela's Father)
Sushma Seth as Sandhya's Fake Mother
Rishi Kapoor as himself in the song 'Kya Naam Hai Tera'
Madan Puri as Film Director
Danny Denzongpa as himself
Agha (actor) as Khan Pathan security guard
Jankidas  as Director Personnel Assistant 
Bob Christo as Rustom

Soundtrack
Lyrics: Anjaan (lyricist)

External links 
 

1983 films
Indian remakes of Pakistani films
1980s Hindi-language films
Films scored by Bappi Lahiri
Hindi remakes of Punjabi films